The Harbin Korean No. 2 Middle School (also Harbin Korean 2nd Nationality Middle School) is a school for ethnic Korean residents of Harbin, Heilongjiang in northeast China.

History
Korean No. 2  Middle School was established in 1962, and received permission to convert from an ordinary middle school to a foreign-language vocational middle school in September 1992. It was the only ethnic vocational middle school in Heilongjiang province. Its conversion into a municipal-level standard school was approved in December 2010.

In 2006, the Heilongjiang College of Education organised computer training for teachers at the school and several other Korean schools in the province. In 2011, the school signed an agreement with the Harbin Tourism Department to train Korean-speaking tour guides.

Building

The No. 2 Korean Middle School is located at 86 Tongjiang Street, Daoli District, in a building constructed in the late 1910s. The same building once housed the city's Jewish Middle School; it is listed by the municipal government as a second-class preserved historical building.

References

Further reading

Education in Harbin
Educational institutions established in 1962
Harbin Heritage Sites
Buildings and structures in Harbin
Jews and Judaism in Harbin
Korean diaspora in China
1962 establishments in China